Beatty is an unincorporated community in Clark County, in the U.S. state of Ohio.

History
Beatty was originally called Chambersburg; the present name was adopted when the post office was established. A post office called Beatty was established in 1888, and remained in operation until 1910.

References

Unincorporated communities in Clark County, Ohio
1888 establishments in Ohio
Populated places established in 1888
Unincorporated communities in Ohio